Empress Min may refer to the following empresses:

Fu Song'e (died 404), consort of Murong Xi (Emperor Zhaowen of Later Yan), posthumously known as Empress Min
Empress Xiao (Sui dynasty) (566–648), wife of Emperor Yang of Sui, posthumously known as Empress Min
Empress Myeongseong (1851–1895), wife of Gojong of Korea before he became an emperor, surnamed Min
Empress Sunmyeong (1872–1907), wife of Sunjong of Korea before his enthronement, surnamed Min